Przemysław Stańczyk (born 12 February 1985 in Szczecin) is an Olympic and national record holding swimmer from Poland. He has swum for Poland at the:
Olympics: 2004, 2008
World Championships: 2003, 2005, 2007
World University Games: 2005, 2009

References

1985 births
Living people
Polish male freestyle swimmers
Swimmers at the 2004 Summer Olympics
Swimmers at the 2008 Summer Olympics
Olympic swimmers of Poland
Sportspeople from Szczecin
World Aquatics Championships medalists in swimming
Universiade medalists in swimming
Universiade gold medalists for Poland
Universiade bronze medalists for Poland
Medalists at the 2009 Summer Universiade
Medalists at the 2005 Summer Universiade
21st-century Polish people